La Madera is an unincorporated community and census-designated place (CDP) in Sandoval County, New Mexico, United States. It was first listed as a CDP prior to the 2020 census.

The CDP is in the southeast corner of the county, bordered to the south by Paa-Ko and Edgewood, both in Bernalillo County. The community sits at the eastern base of the Sandia Mountains, which rise to the west  to the summit of Sandia Crest, elevation .

Demographics

Education
It is in the Bernalillo Public Schools district, which operates Bernalillo High School.

References 

Census-designated places in Sandoval County, New Mexico
Census-designated places in New Mexico